The Taneyev Quartet made its first appearance in the Small Hall of the Leningrad Conservatory in the winter of 1946. Its members were students. The quartet played in particular the quartets of Beethoven, Tchaikovsky, and Taneiev but also included first performances of works by the Leningrad composers V. Salmanov, O. Evlakhov, V. Basner, A. Chernov, V. Agafonnikov and others. The name of Taneyev was adopted by the Quartet in 1963. Its members are: Vladmir Ovcharek, Grigori Lutski, Vissarion Soloview and Josif Levinson.

Sources 
Liner note with S. Taneyev, String Quartets No. 8 in C Major; String Quartet No. 9 in A major, Melodiya MA 12411

Russian string quartets